Physalospora disrupta is a plant pathogen infecting mangoes.

References

External links 
 Index Fungorum
 USDA ARS Fungal Database

Fungal plant pathogens and diseases
Mango tree diseases
Xylariales